The dharmachakra (Sanskrit: धर्मचक्र; Pali: dhammacakka) or wheel of dharma is a widespread symbol used in Indian religions such as Hinduism, Jainism, and especially Buddhism.

Historically, the dharmachakra was often used as a decoration in East Asian statues and inscriptions, beginning with the earliest period of East Asian culture to the present. It remains a major symbol of the Buddhist religion today.

Etymology
The Sanskrit noun dharma ( धर्म ) is a derivation from the root dhṛ 'to hold, maintain, keep', and means 'what is established or firm' and hence 'law'. It is derived from the Vedic Sanskrit n-stem dharman- with the meaning "bearer, supporter" in the historical Vedic religion conceived of as an aspect of Ṛta.

History and usage
Similar wheel/chakra symbols are one of the most ancient in all Indian history. Madhavan and Parpola note that a wheel symbol appears frequently in Indus Valley civilization artifacts, particularly on several seals. Notably, it is present in a sequence of ten signs on the Dholavira Signboard. As a solar symbol it first appears on clay seals of the Indus Valley Civilisation from 2500 BCE. Such a wheel is also the main attribute of Vishnu.

Some historians associate the ancient chakra symbols with solar symbolism. In the Vedas, the god Surya is associated with the solar disc, which is said to be a chariot of one wheel (cakra). Mitra, a form of Surya, is described as "the eye of the world", and thus the sun is conceived of as an eye (cakṣu) which illuminates and perceives the world. Thus, a wheel symbol might also be associated with light and knowledge.

Buddhist usage and significance

In Buddhism, the Dharma Chakra is widely used to represent the Buddha's Dharma (Buddha's teaching and the universal moral order), Gautama Buddha himself and the walking of the path to enlightenment, since the time of Early Buddhism. The symbol is also sometimes connected to the Four Noble Truths, the Noble Eightfold Path and Dependent Origination.
The pre-Buddhist dharmachakra (Pali: dhammacakka) is considered one of the ashtamangala (auspicious signs) in Hinduism and Buddhism and often used as a symbol of both faiths. It is one of the oldest known Indian symbols found in Indian art, appearing with the first surviving post-Indus Valley Civilisation Indian iconography in the time of the Buddhist king Ashoka.

The Buddha is said to have set the "wheel of dharma" in motion when he delivered his first sermon, which is described in the Dhammacakkappavattana Sutta. This "turning of the wheel" signifies a great and revolutionary change with universal consequences, brought about by an exceptional human being. Buddhism adopted the wheel as a symbol from the Indian mythical idea of the ideal king, called a chakravartin ("wheel-turner", or "universal monarch"), who was said to possess several mythical objects, including the ratana cakka (the ideal wheel). The Mahā Sudassana Sutta of the Digha Nikaya describes this wheel as having a nave (nābhi), a thousand spokes (sahassārāni) and a felly (nemi), all of which are perfect in every respect. Siddhartha Gautama was said to have been a "mahapurisa" (great man) who could have chosen to become a wheel turning king, but instead became the spiritual counterpart to such a king, a wheel turning sage, i.e. a Buddha.

In his explanation of the term "turning the wheel of Dharma", the Theravada exegete Buddhaghosa explains that this "wheel" which the Buddha turned is primarily to be understood as wisdom, knowledge, and insight (ñāṇa). This wisdom has two aspects, paṭivedha-ñāṇa, the wisdom of self-realisation of the Truth and desanā-ñāṇa, the wisdom of proclamation of the Truth. The dharmachakra symbol also points to the central Indian idea of "Dharma", a complex and multivalent term which refers to the eternal cosmic law, universal moral order and in Buddhism, the very teaching and path expounded by the Buddha. 

In the Buddhist Art at early sites such as Bharhut and Sanchi, the dharmachakra was often used as a symbol of Gautama Buddha himself. The symbol is often paired with the triratna (triple jewel) or trishula (trident) symbolizing the triple gem, umbrellas (chatra), symbols of sovereignty and royal power, gems and garlands. It is also sometimes depicted alongside animals such as lions, or deer.

There are different designs of the Buddhist dharmachakra with 8, 12, 24 or more spokes. In different Buddhist traditions, the different number of spokes may represent different aspects of the Buddha's Dharma (teaching). In the Indo-Tibetan Buddhist tradition for example, the 8 spoked wheel represents the noble eightfold path, and the hub, rim and spokes are also said to represent the three trainings (sila, prajña and samadhi).

In Buddhism, the cyclical movement of a wheel is also used to symbolize the cyclical nature of life in the world (also referred to as the "wheel of samsara", samsara-chakra or the "wheel of becoming", bhava-cakra). This wheel of suffering can be reversed or "turned" through the practice of the Buddhist path. The Buddhist terms for "suffering" (dukkha) and happiness (sukha) may also originally be related to the proper or improper fitting of wheels on a chariot's axle. The Indo-Tibetan tradition has developed elaborate depictions called Bhavacakras which depict the many realms of rebirth in Buddhist cosmology.

The spokes of a wheel are also often used as symbols of the Buddhist doctrine of dependent origination. According to the Theravada scholar Buddhaghosa:“It is the beginningless round of rebirths that is called the ’Wheel of the round of rebirths’ (saṃsāracakka). Ignorance (avijjā) is its hub (or nave) because it is its root. Ageing-and-death (jarā-maraṇa) is its rim (or felly) because it terminates it. The remaining ten links [of Dependent Origination] are its spokes [i.e. saṅkhāra up to the process of becoming, bhava].” The earliest Indian monument featuring dharmachakras are the Ashokan Pillars, such as the lion pillar at Sanchi, built at the behest of the Mauryan emperor Ashoka. According to Benjamin Rowland: ”The Sārnāth column may be interpreted, therefore, not only as a glorification of the Buddha’s preaching symbolised by the crowning wheel, but also through the cosmological implications of the whole pillar as a symbol of the universal extension of the power of the Buddha’s Law as typified by the sun that dominates all space and all time, and simultaneously an emblem of the universal extension of Mauryan imperialism through the Dharma. The whole structure is then a translation of age-old Indian and Asiatic cosmology into artistic terms of essentially foreign origin and dedicated, like all Asoka’s monuments, to the glory of Buddhism and the royal house.”According to Harrison, the symbolism of "the wheel of the law" and the order of Nature is also visible in the Tibetan prayer wheels. The moving wheels symbolize the movement of cosmic order (ṛta).

Jain, Hindu and modern Indian usages

The dharmachakra is a symbol in the sramana religion of Jainism, sometimes on statues of the Tirthankaras.
The idea of a great king being associated with turning the "Wheel of Dharma" is something which is shared by Buddhism and Hinduism. In the Vishnu Purana and Bhagavata Purana, two kings named Jadabharata of the Hindu solar and lunar dynasties respectively are referred to as "chakravartins" (wheel turning kings).

Wheel symbolism was widely used in Indian temples, especially in temples to Surya, the sun god, the most famous of which is the Konark Sun Temple.

In the Bhagavad Gita, verses 14, 15 and 16, of Chapter 3 speaks about the revolving wheel thus: "From food, the beings are born; from rain, food is produced; rain proceeds from sacrifice (yagnya); yagnya arises out of action; know that from Brahma, action proceeds; Brahma is born of Brahman, the eternal Paramatman. The one who does not follow the wheel thus revolving, leads a sinful, vain life, rejoicing in the senses."

The 24 spoke Ashoka dharmachakra is present in the modern flag of India, representing the pan-Indian concept of Dharma. The modern State Emblem of India is a depiction of the Lion Capital of Ashoka (Sanchi), which includes the dharmachakra. An integral part of the emblem is the motto inscribed in Devanagari script: Satyameva Jayate. This is a quote from the Mundaka Upanishad, the concluding part of the Vedas.

Sarvepalli Radhakrishnan, the first Vice President of India, stated that the Ashoka Chakra of India represents the "wheel of the law of dharma", as well as "Truth or satya", "Virtue" as well as "motion", as in the "dynamism of a peaceful change".

Other uses and similar symbols
 Similar wheel symbols were used as a solar symbol by the Ancient Egyptians.
 Some Buddha statues also depict the related Dharmachakra Mudrā, a hand sign depicting the turning of the Dharma wheel.
 A very similar wheel symbol also appears in the flag of the Romani people, hinting to their nomadic history and their Indian origins.
 In non-Buddhist cultural contexts, an eight-spoked wheel resembles a traditional ship's wheel. As a nautical emblem, this image is a common sailor tattoo, which may be misidentified as a dharmachakra or vice versa.
 The sonnenrad is a similar symbol used by occultists and neo-nazis.
 Falun Gong uses the concept of a similar wheel as a central concept
 In the Unicode computer standard, the dharmachakra is called the "Wheel of Dharma" and found in the eight-spoked form. It is represented as U+2638 (☸). As emoji: ☸️.

Gallery

Historical and archeological examples

Contemporary examples

National flags and official symbolism

Notes

References

Sources

Further reading

External links 
 

 Buddhist Wheel Symbol (Dharmachakra)

Buddhist symbols
Tibetan Buddhist practices
Indian culture